Llano Grande is a corregimiento in Ocú District, Herrera Province, Panama with a population of 1,062 as of 2010. Its population as of 1990 was 1,137; its population as of 2000 was 1,126.

References

Corregimientos of Herrera Province